Department of the Pacific (MarPac) was a United States Marine Corps ground training and administrative command established on November 15, 1920, which was responsible for the administration, training and equipment of the Marine Corps Units on the West Coast, 14th Naval District (Hawaii and outlying Pacific islands), 16th Naval District (the Philippines), 17th Naval District (Alaska and Aleutian Islands) and Marine Forces in Northern China (China Marines).

History

The Department of the Pacific was activated as Marine Corps subheadquarters on November 15, 1920 in San Francisco with former Commandant of the Marines, Major general George Barnett, in command. During the World War II, the staff and administrative units consisted of: Headquarters Company, Office of the Paymaster, Personnel Section (G-1), Intelligence Section (G-2), Operations Section (G-3) and Supply Section (G-4). Department of the Pacific administered all marine units and activities on the West Coast of the United States include Supply depots in San Francisco.

Following the end of War, responsibilities of Department of the Pacific were expanded to administration of all non Fleet Marine Force units in the Pacific Ocean Area. Department of the Pacific was deactivated on July 1, 1960 and its responsibilities were transferred to Fleet Marine Force Pacific and Headquarters Marine Corps.

Commanding generals

See also
 Marine Air, West Coast
 Fleet Marine Force Pacific

References

Military units and formations in California
Military units and formations of the United States Marine Corps
Allied commands of World War II
Military units and formations established in 1920
Military units and formations disestablished in 1960